Andor Horvag (born 1 May 1886, date of death unknown) was a Hungarian athlete. He competed in the men's standing high jump at the 1912 Summer Olympics.

References

1886 births
Year of death missing
Athletes (track and field) at the 1912 Summer Olympics
Hungarian male high jumpers
Olympic athletes of Hungary
Athletes from Budapest